Amber Ferenz (born 1972) is an American musician, music educator and composer.

Life
Amber Ferenz graduated with a bachelor's degree in bassoon performance from the North Carolina School of the Arts, and a Master of Fine Arts in orchestral performance from the California Institute of the Arts, and they studied with Mark Popkin, Julie Feves and Steven Dibner. After completing their studies, they worked as a bassoonist, becoming principal bassoonist of the Fayetteville Symphony, and the second bassoonist with the Asheville Symphony. They have also taught bassoon at California Polytechnic State University at San Luis Obispo, California Institute of the Arts, the University of North Carolina at Charlotte, and Wake Forest University.

Ferenz is also a violinist and has been a fellow at the Aspen Music Festival. They are a founding member of the Los Angeles-based chamber music collective inauthentica and have performed with the Open Dream Ensemble.

Works
Ferenz composes mainly for solo bassoon and chamber ensemble. Selected works include:
Love Medicine
Unfinished Conversations
Ice Cream Truck, for bassoon quartet
Songs for Wicked children
Los Angeles Sketches, for 4 bassoons
Ice Cream Truck 2: "Son of Ice Cream Truck", for bassoon quartet

References

1972 births
20th-century classical composers
21st-century American composers
21st-century classical composers
American women classical composers
American classical composers
American music educators
Living people
20th-century American women musicians
20th-century American composers
21st-century American women musicians
Women music educators
20th-century women composers
21st-century women composers